The São Paulo Monster was a criminal that attacked young children in April 1973 in the Bari and Pari regions of São Paulo, Brazil. He was never identified or captured.

Early attacks
On March 8, 1973, the offender convinced DMP, a girl, resident of Vila Prudente, to walk with him to a nearby apartment near Vergueiro street, where he promised a gift for her. But, inside the building, he attempted to rape her, whereupon she screamed for help and alarmed residents of the building. The attacker, fearing for his capture, threw the girl against the wall, injuring her.

Initially, three children were attacked by the Monster. On April 2, 1973, the child MPR, six-year-old, was waving to her father who was exiting his house and stayed there for some minutes when someone said her father was waiting her at a nearby gas station. With the kidnapper and the child with hands together, with whom she walked from 400 meters. She then rapidly entered an apartment, going to the third floor, where the kidnapper raped her. Hours later, the girl was found by someone in the hallway. Rescued, she was taken to the Hospital das Clinicas.

On April 23, 1973, at 4:30 p.m. six-year-old child AGS, daughter of AG and EVG, exited her house to visit a nearby bakery in Pari to buy roulade. About an hour later, her mother, concerned of her absence, went to search for her. She was informed that AGS did not visit the bakery and was not seen near it. Then, her mother went to look at neighbor houses, however, she could not find her daughter. She then contacted her spouse, AG, who just came from work. With the help of friends, parents and neighbors, they went for another search for the little girl. However, they still could not find her; it was the time they decided to inform a nearby police station about the little girl disappearance. Various RONE and ROTA police cars went to search for the girl, looking the Pari region, or attempted to have a lead to her disappearance. Then, a woman with a child in her arms, Maria Alves da Cruz, along with her spouse, Antonio Alves da Cruz, entered the police station and explained what occurred.

According to Antonio Alves, while he was lying in his bed, and when a ring bell rang, her wife went to verify who was outside. But, before opening the door, she asked several times who was outside. She didn't hear a reply, however, she heard, a cry of low sound, of a child. She then alerted to her husband, and he opened the door. The child, leaning against the wall, with her clothes covered in blood, semi-unconscious and almost falling down. The girl had a blond hair and had blue eyes, who attempted to cry but could not. Besides her, there was a piece of paper, who read: I had much sorrow for her, because she is six-year-old. She does not even know where she resides, this is why I write this below because this was there where I got her and kidnapped. Take her to the nearby police station to them deliver her to her house. I cannot say my name. Greetings. Where I will go, I could not take her with me, because I live in Franco da Rocha. Lives in the street Rio Bonito, near the street Rua Oracilas, near to the church. Bairro of the Alto de Pari. Church on the end of the street Barão de Ladário, in Bra... Dear young woman - please read this. I leave the child with you. Take care of her and read the other part

The police chief Waltrides Gonçalves Cyrino, seeing the state of the child, sent her to the Ipiranga PS, making contact immediately with the 30º Distrito Policial, to ask to them if there was a record for a missing girl. It was there that the facts then matched. The girl's parents were alarmed, arriving at the 26º Distrito, with enough time to watch their child in the Hospital das Clinicas, where the girl was taken seriously wounded.

Later attacks
Five-year-old PHMC, who had green eyes, also a resident of Vila Prudente, was playing outside her home when she saw a person (who matched the later description in the investigation) who told her to go with him at a nearby building, where her mother was waiting her. The girl then gave her hands with the unidentified person and walked with him to the apartment building. After raping the girl, he told her to see her mother, who supposedly was at the mentioned apartment. Crying and terrified, she went upstairs, while the offender walked out.

Investigation
The offender was being hunted by police officers Hélio Braga, Waltride Cyrino as well as José Campanella. The attack on MPR was linked to that of AGS, and another on the street Cipriano Viana.  Initially, they could not found if the attacker was black, or white, tall or short. But they later ascertained that he was a brown man, with no mustaches, with frizzy and long hair who wears red pants and a white shirt with several balls in it, has blue eyes, who always has a child aged 5 or 6 of green or blue eyes as his companion. Motorists, taxi and bus drivers, were alerted to identify the man who was accompanying the child. The offender may has used a vehicle to drive with his victims or walked in foot to apartments, where he would rape them. Although he had five confirmed victims, police suspected that over a dozen children were attacked by him. Police chief Aldo Gagliano as soon as he heard about the first case, he began an investigation concerning the attacker.

Taxi driver José Manuel Correia de Almeida said that as he was to exit the Estrada das Lágrimas, in Alto do Sacomã, received a sign to stop that was given by an unidentified person who had a girl with 6 years or lower. According to the de Almeida, the girl was the same one that was attacked by the offender who left a note confessing to the crime. He said that "I attempted to see the face of the man by the rear-view, but he hid himself in the car, making impending me from seeing his physiognomy. The child was crying and calling for her mother. To explain the child tears, the man said to me that he left his wife in S. Caetano, to where we went to. Near Avenida Almirante Delamare, he ordered to stop, and avoiding being seen by me, paid the ride and left the car with the child in his arms." Police could not make MPR recognize the driver, because she was seriously injured in the hospital.

There were several suspects arrested, including Pedro Batista dos Santos, resident of Nossa Senhora da Consolata. However, de Almeida said that dos Santos was not the man he gave a ride. Police chiefs who worked in the case include Alberto Barbour, Aldo Gagliano, Hélio Braga and José Campanella. They were also working in a police sketch.

In a police lecture carried by phone by Campanella, Gagliano, Barbour, Braga and Cyrino regarding the letter and the part "because I live in Franco da Rocha" has made as a reference aiming at two things: as a red herring to the police or indicating that he had been a patient in the Hospital dos Alienados. The hospital theory was supported by the police officers, whereupon the police officers began to take investigation at the aforementioned hospital.

References

Brazilian rapists
1970s in Brazil
Unidentified rapists
Unsolved crimes in Brazil
Kidnappers